Johan Gunnar Gren (31 October 1920 – 10 November 1991) was a Swedish professional football player and coach. He is best remembered for playing for IFK Göteborg and A.C. Milan.

A creative forward, known for his technical skill, vision, tactical intelligence, and passing ability as a playmaker, he was part of the famous "Gre-No-Li" trio of forwards at Milan and the Sweden national team. He was also capable of playing as an attacking midfielder, as an offensive–minded central midfielder, known as the mezzala role in Italian football jargon, or even as a striker.

A full international between 1940 and 1958, he won 57 caps and scored 32 goals for the Sweden national team. He was a part of the Sweden team that won gold at the 1948 Summer Olympics, as well as the team that finished second at the 1958 FIFA World Cup. In 1946, he was awarded Guldbollen as Sweden's best footballer of the year. Gren is considered to be one of Sweden's greatest and most prolific football players; a statue has been erected in his honor outside Gamla Ullevi stadium.

Early years
Gren was born on 31 October 1920 to parents Johan Olsson and Gerda Maria Olsson. Gren, a son of a carpenter, grew up in Majorna, Gothenburg. From a young age, Gren excelled in football.  On 7 October 1934, Gothenburg Football Association President Carl 'Ceve' Linde held a juggling contest. He won his first sporting prize – a bronze plaque. Göteborgs Sport Bladet wrote about 13-year-old Gren's skills and how he outshone some of the big boys in the national league. The then, 13-year-old Gren played for Bollklubben Strix. During his youth, he played for Lindholmens BK and GAIK before playing Gårda BK.

Club career

Gårda BK
In 1937 he started playing for Gårda BK. He made his Allsvenskan debut on 1 May 1938 against Malmö FF which resulted in a scoreless draw. During his time there, he played a total of 54 matches scoring 16 goals.

IFK Göteborg
In 1941, he was recruited by IFK Gothenburg. During his time in the club, Gren won one national championships in the 1941/42 season and was top scorer in 1947. He won the first ever Guldbollen in 1946.
His first league match for IFK was in August 1941, IFK played against Gårda BK winning 6–1 with Gren scoring the first goal. His last league game for IFK was on 6 June 1949 versus IFK Norrköping at Gamla Ullevi in which Gothenburg lost 0–1. He had played 164 matches for IFK and scored 78 goals.

AC Milan
On 11 September 1949, he debuted for A.C. Milan against Sampdoria, with Milan winning 1–3. During his time with Milan, he became the 'Gre' part of the famous Gre-No-Li trio with his Swedish teammates Gunnar Nordahl ('No') and Nils Liedholm ('Li'). He also earned the nickname the "Il Professore" which is Italian for "the professor". While at A.C. Milan, he won the league title for the 1950/51 season. He made 133 appearances in Serie A and scored 38 goals. Gren also managed AC Milan in 1952 before moving to AC Fiorentina.

Later career
In 1953, Gren moved to AC Fiorentina where he made 55 appearances and scored 5 goals. Then in 1955, Gren moved to Genoa CFC where he made 29 appearances and 2 goals. Tired of Italy, Gren decided to move back to Sweden. In 1956, Gren returned to Gothenburg where he joined Örgryte IS as both player and manager. Gren left in 1959 and played for GAIS in 1963.

International career

Gren made his debut for Sweden on 29 August 1940 in the team's 3–2 win over Finland. During the next decade he played 40 matches for the national team, ending in 1949 with 3–1 against Ireland in a World Cup qualifier and 2–2 in a friendly against Hungary. During this era Gren was part of the team that won the gold medal in the 1948 Olympics in London, scoring twice against Yugoslavia in the final on Wembley.

As a professional, Gren was suspended from the Swedish national team. However, as the World Cup of 1958 was to be played on home soil and the Swedish team seemed too weak for the competition, the Swedish Football Association changed this rule, and Gren, having now ended his professional career and playing in the Swedish Division 2, was again eligible. Gren went on to be the oldest player of this World Cup, 37 years old, and played an important role in the silver medal-winning Swedish team. He played five matches during the World Cup and scored one goal, 2–1 against West Germany in the semi-final.
He was also named on the 1958 World Cup All-Star Team.

Gren's last cap came on 26 October 1958 against Denmark in a 4–4 draw. At the time, he was 37 years, 360 days old. In all, Gren made 57 appearances for the national team, scoring 32 goals.

Management
Whilst at A.C. Milan, Gren managed the team in 1952. Also, Gren managed both Örgryte IS and GAIS as player manager. After retiring as a player, Gren managed several teams. Gren became the technical director for Juventus for a brief period in 1961. Gren then managed for GAIS, IFK Värnamo, Redbergslids IK, Skogens IF, IK Oddevold and Fässbergs IF.

Retirement
Gren retired from football in the 1970s. He died ten days after his 71st birthday and is buried in Västra Kyrkogården (Western Cemetery), Gothenburg, Västra Götaland, Sweden.

Career statistics

Club

International

Scores and results list Sweden's goal tally first, score column indicates score after each Gren goal.

Honours

IFK Göteborg
 Allsvenskan: 1941–42

A.C. Milan
 Serie A: 1950–51
 Latin Cup: 1950–51
Sweden
 FIFA World Cup runner-up: 1958
 Summer Olympics: 1948
 Nordic Football Championship: 1937–47, 1948–51, 1956–59 
Individual
 Guldbollen: 1946
 Allsvenskan top scorer: 1946–47
 Goteborg Football Association Juggling Award: 1934
 A.C. Milan Hall of Fame

References

External links

 Detail of international appearances and goals – by Roberto Mamrud, RSSSF

1920 births
1991 deaths
Swedish footballers
Sweden international footballers
Olympic footballers of Sweden
Olympic gold medalists for Sweden
Footballers at the 1948 Summer Olympics
Gårda BK players
IFK Göteborg players
A.C. Milan players
ACF Fiorentina players
Genoa C.F.C. players
Örgryte IS players
IK Oddevold players
Serie A players
Allsvenskan players
Swedish football managers
A.C. Milan managers
Örgryte IS managers
IFK Göteborg managers
Juventus F.C. managers
GAIS managers
IFK Värnamo managers
IK Oddevold managers
Serie A managers
1958 FIFA World Cup players
Expatriate footballers in Italy
Expatriate football managers in Italy
Swedish expatriate footballers
Olympic medalists in football
Medalists at the 1948 Summer Olympics
Footballers from Gothenburg
Association football forwards
Swedish expatriate sportspeople in Italy